Tesma is a genus of moths in the subfamily Arctiinae.

Species
 Tesma fractifascia Hampson, 1918
 Tesma nigrapex Strand, 1912

References

Natural History Museum Lepidoptera generic names catalog

Lithosiini
Moth genera